Mounier is a surname, and may refer to:

 Anthony Mounier (born 1987), French footballer
 Emmanuel Mounier (1905–1950), French philosopher
 Flo Mounier (born 1974), French drummer of the metal band Cryptopsy
 Jean-Jacques Mounier (born 1949), French judoka 
 Jean Joseph Mounier (1758–1806), French politician

See also
 Meunier
 Menier
 Minier
 Munier